Chaabet El Ham is a municipality in northwestern Algeria.

References

Communes of Aïn Témouchent Province